Shane Durkin (born 1 July 1987) is an Irish hurler who plays for Dublin Senior Championship club Ballyboden St Enda's. He usually plays as a wing-back, but can also be deployed at midfield. Durkin was a member of the Dublin senior hurling team that won the 2011 National League and 2013 Leinster Championship.

Durkin first came to prominence as a hurler and Gaelic footballer at juvenile and underage levels with the Ballyboden St Enda's club. After losing back-to-back Dublin Minor Championship finals, he later won back-to-back Dublin Under-21 Championship titles in 2006 and 2007. As a member of the Ballyboden St Enda's senior teams as a dual player, Durkin has won a combined total of nine Dublin Senior Championships, a Leinster Club Football Championship and an All-Ireland Club Football Championship in 2016.

Durkin first played for Dublin as a member of the 2005 Leinster Minor Championship-winning team, before later winning a Leinster Under-21 Championship medal in 2007. He made his first appearance with the Dublin senior team in 2009 and enjoyed his first success by winning a National Hurling League medal in 2011. Durkin later won a Leinster Senior Championship medal in 2013, when Dublin claimed the title for the first time in 52 years. He ended the year by being nominated for an All Star. Durkin announced his retirement from inter-county hurling on 7 January 2019.

Career statistics

Honours

Ballyboden St Enda's
All-Ireland Senior Club Football Championship (1): 2016
Leinster Senior Club Football Championship (1): 2015
Dublin Senior Hurling Championship (7): 2007, 2008, 2009, 2010, 2011, 2013, 2018
Dublin Senior Football Championship (2): 2009, 2015
Dublin Under-21 Hurling Championship (2): 2006, 2007

Dublin
Leinster Senior Hurling Championship (1): 2013
National Hurling League Division 1 (1): 2011
National Hurling League Division 1B (1): 2013
Leinster Under-21 Hurling Championship (1): 2007
Leinster Minor Hurling Championship (1): 2005

References

External links
Shane Durkin profile at the Dublin GAA website

1987 births
Living people
Ballyboden St Enda's hurlers
Ballyboden St Enda's Gaelic footballers
Dual players
Dublin inter-county hurlers
Hurling backs
Irish schoolteachers